Meredith Irwin Flory, known professionally as Med Flory (August 27, 1926 – March 12, 2014), was an American jazz saxophonist, bandleader, and actor.

Early years
Flory was born in Logansport, Indiana, United States. His mother was an organist and encouraged him to learn clarinet as a child. During World War II, he was an Army Air Force pilot, and after the war he received his college degree in philosophy from Indiana University.

Career 
Flory played in the bands of Claude Thornhill and Woody Herman in the early 1950s, before forming his own ensemble in New York City. In 1955, he relocated to California and started a new group, which played at the 1958 Monterey Jazz Festival. In the late 1950s, he played with Terry Gibbs, Art Pepper, and Herman again, playing both tenor and baritone saxophone. He was cast in twenty-nine episodes from 1956 to 1957 of the ABC variety show, The Ray Anthony Show.

In the 1960s, Flory was less active in music, working in television and film as an actor and screenwriter; his credits include Wagon Train, The Rifleman, Ripcord (twice), Rawhide (twice), Gunsmoke (twice), Perry Mason (twice - including 'The Case of Crying Comedian'), Maverick (twice), The Virginian (five episodes), Route 66 (twice), Bronco, Surfside 6, Mona McCluskey, Run, Buddy, Run, 77 Sunset Strip (three episodes), The Dakotas, Destry, Lawman (three episodes), Wendy and Me, It's a Man's World,  The Monroes, Cimarron Strip, Daniel Boone (seven episodes), Gomer Pyle, U.S.M.C. (twice), Bonanza (three episodes), Mannix, Lassie (ten episodes), How the West Was Won (three episodes), High Mountain Rangers (four episodes as Sheriff Mike McBride) and the films, Starsky and Hutch (once), The Gumball Rally, The Night of the Grizzly with Clint Walker and The Nutty Professor with Jerry Lewis.

In the mid-1960s Flory worked with Art Pepper and Joe Maini on transcriptions and arrangements of Charlie Parker recordings, and in 1972, he co-founded Supersax, an ensemble devoted to Parker's work. Supersax's debut album, Supersax Plays Bird, won a Grammy Award.

In 1972, Flory appeared in the first episode of the final season of Mission Impossible as Toledo.

Personal life
Flory was married to Joan Barbara Fry until her death in 2000.

Death 
Flory died of a heart ailment on March 12, 2014, in Hollywood, California, at the age of 87.

Filmography

Gun Street (1961) - Willie Driscoll
Spencer's Mountain (1963) - Spencer Brother (uncredited)
The Nutty Professor (1963) - Warzewski
Move Over, Darling (1963) - Seaman (uncredited)
Man's Favorite Sport? (1964) - Tucker (uncredited)
Mike and the Mermaid (1964) - Dad
The Night of the Grizzly (1966) - Duke Squires
Doctor, You've Got to Be Kidding! (1967) - Policeman
The Reluctant Astronaut (1967) - White Shirt in Bar (uncredited)
Rough Night in Jericho (1967) - Weaver (uncredited)
The Big Mouth (1967) - Male Nurse (uncredited)
The Trouble with Girls (1969) - Constable
Which Way to the Front? (1970) - G.I. Sentry (uncredited)
Suppose They Gave a War and Nobody Came (1970) - Military Policeman (uncredited)
Home for the Holidays (1972) - Sheriff Nolan
The Teacher (1974) - Joe Roberts
Let's Do It Again (1975) - Rufus
Hustle (1975) - Albino-Beating Cop
The Gumball Rally (1976) - Officer Williams
Uncle Joe Shannon (1978) - Humphreys / Shannon's Musicians - Keyboard
The Hearse (1980) - Sheriff Denton
The Boogens (1981) - Dan Ostroff

References

External links

1926 births
2014 deaths
Musicians from Indiana
People from Logansport, Indiana
American male actors
American jazz saxophonists
American male saxophonists
American male jazz musicians
United States Army Air Forces pilots of World War II
20th-century American saxophonists